Yasti Bulagh (also Romanized as Yāstī Būlāgh; also known as Yāstī Bolāgh and Yāsu Bulāq) is a village in Zarrineh Rud Rural District, Bizineh Rud District, Khodabandeh County, Zanjan Province, Iran. At the 2006 census, its population was 308, in 54 families.

References 

Populated places in Khodabandeh County